Nicholas Gregory Duron (born January 30, 1996) is an American professional baseball pitcher in the San Francisco Giants organization.  He played college baseball for Clark College in Vancouver, Washington.  He was drafted by the Boston Red Sox in the 31st round of the 2015 MLB June Amateur Draft. He made his major league debut in 2022.

Career
Duron was born in Salinas, California. He attended Everett Alvarez High School in Salinas and Tigard High School ('14) in Tigard, Oregon. He then attended Clark College in Vancouver, Washington, for whom he was 2–1 with a 3.75 earned-run average, and struck out 40 batters in 36 innings.

Boston Red Sox
He was drafted by the Boston Red Sox in the 31st round of the 2015 MLB June Amateur Draft. In 2015, he pitched for the GCL Red Sox in the Gulf Coast League, and was 2–1 with two saves and a 1.71 ERA in 26.1 innings in which he struck out 28 batters. He missed the 2016 season, after undergoing Tommy John surgery to repair an ulnar collateral ligament injury.

In 2017, Duron spent the season with the Low-A Lowell Spinners, pitching to a 3-5 record and 3.35 ERA with 36 strikeouts in 53.2 innings of work across 13 appearances (12 starts). The next year, he split the season between the rookie-level GCL Red Sox and the Single-A Greenville Drive, posting a cumulative 0-6 record and 7.53 ERA with 24 strikeouts in 28.2 innings pitched in 10 games (6 starts). On March 28, 2019, Duron was released by the Red Sox organization.

Southern Illinois Miners
On April 29, 2019, Duron signed with the Southern Illinois Miners of the Frontier League. In 10 games, he recorded a 2-0 record and 1.35 ERA with 18 strikeouts and 2 saves in 13.1 innings pitched.

Seattle Mariners
On June 7, 2019, Duron signed a minor league contract with the Seattle Mariners organization. He finished the year appearing in 25 games for the High-A Modesto Nuts, logging a 3-1 record and 2.23 ERA with 51 strikeouts in 36.1 innings pitched.

Duron did not play in a game in 2020 due to the cancellation of the minor league season because of the COVID-19 pandemic. He split 2021 between the Double-A Arkansas Travelers and the Triple-A Tacoma Rainiers. He was a combined 4–2 with four saves and a 4.50 ERA in 38 relief appearances covering 42 innings in which he struck out 43 batters. He became a free agent following the season on November 7, 2021.

Philadelphia Phillies
On January 9, 2022, Duron signed a minor league contract with the Philadelphia Phillies organization. In 2022, pitching for the Triple-A Lehigh Valley IronPigs, Duron worked to a 4–7 record with seven saves and a 2.77 ERA in 52 relief appearances covering 48.2 innings in which he struck out 63 batters (11.7 strikeouts/9 innings), and induced a 50.4% ground-ball percentage.  He was named a 2022 MiLB Organization All Star.

On July 12, 2022, Duron was selected to the 40-man roster and promoted to the major leagues for the first time. He made his major league debut on July 13, 2022. His fastball averaged 97.2 mph during his MLB appearance.  He elected free agency on November 10, 2022.

San Francisco Giants
On December 15, 2022, Duron signed a minor league contract with the San Francisco Giants organization.

References

External links

1996 births
Living people
Sportspeople from Salinas, California
Baseball players from California
Major League Baseball pitchers
Philadelphia Phillies players
Gulf Coast Red Sox players
Lowell Spinners players
Greenville Drive players
Modesto Nuts players
Southern Illinois Miners players
Arkansas Travelers players
Tacoma Rainiers players
Lehigh Valley IronPigs players